The City Rises (La città che sale) (1910) is a painting by the Italian painter Umberto Boccioni. It was his first major Futurist work.

Background
The original title of the painting was Il lavoro (Work), as it appeared at the Mostra d'arte libera (Exhibition of free art) in Milan in 1911. Though realistic elements are present, such as the building, and the space is still rendered through perspective, this painting is considered the first true futurist work by Umberto Boccioni, even though it is not markedly different from his several previous works centered on suburbs. In this painting the naturalistic vision of the previous works is partly abandoned, replaced by a more dynamic vision.

Subject
Buildings in construction in a suburb can be seen with chimneys in the upper part, but most of the space is occupied by men and horses, melted together in a dynamic effort. Boccioni thus emphasizes some of the most typical elements of futurism, the exaltation of human work and the importance of the modern town, built around modern necessities.
The painting portrays the construction of a new city with developments and technology. Suburbs, and the urban environment in general, formed the basis of many of Boccioni's paintings, from the capture of the staccato sounds of construction in The Street-Pavers to the riot of sound and colour offered to the observer of street scenes, as typified by The Street Enters the House.

Provenance
In 1912, the picture was bought by the musician Ferruccio Busoni during the travelling futurist art exposition in Europe. It has been exhibited in the Museum of Modern Art in New York City as part of their permanent collection.

References

Paintings by Umberto Boccioni
1910 paintings
Paintings in the collection of the Museum of Modern Art (New York City)